Steffan Fin Argus (born September 1, 1998) is an American actor, musician, and model.

Early life and education
Argus is from Des Plaines, Illinois. They have an older sister, Sadie, and a younger sister, Lacey. They were a self-described "theatre kid" growing up and learned to play several instruments. "I picked up the Spanish guitar in third grade... Then the piano. Then the French horn. Then the cello. Then the ukulele, mandolin, and banjo. Then the bass guitar." They attended Maine West High School and then studied at Berklee College of Music in Boston.

Career
Argus began acting in local theatre productions at a young age and was a member of Kidz Bop. They are signed with Ford Models and modeled the Yves Saint Laurent 2016 Spring / Summer Line for Barneys New York. They released an EP in 2017 titled Lost at Sea.

They starred in the web series The Commute. Argus was cast in the lead role as Zach Sobiech in the Disney+ musical drama Clouds. They appeared on Agents of S.H.I.E.L.D. as a younger version of Gordon, previously played by Jamie Harris.

Personal life
Argus is gay, and uses they/them pronouns. Argus is gender queer.

Filmography

Film

Television
{| class="wikitable sortable"
|-
! Year
! Title
! Role
! Notes
|-
|2017
|The Gifted
|Jack
|Episode: "eXposed"
|-
|2020
|Agents of S.H.I.E.L.D.
|Young Gordon
|2 episodes
|-
|2022
|Queer as Folk
|Mingus
|Main cast
|-
| 2023
| The Other Two
| TBA
| TBA
|}

Web

DiscographyMake Me Cry (2016)Lost at Sea (2017)Exposure'' (2022)

References

External links

Living people
1998 births
21st-century American singers
21st-century American LGBT people
American child singers
American male child actors
American gay actors
Berklee College of Music alumni
Musicians from Illinois
American gay musicians
People from Des Plaines, Illinois
Non-binary musicians
Non-binary models
American non-binary actors